
Gmina Bolesławiec is a rural gmina (administrative district) in Wieruszów County, Łódź Voivodeship, in central Poland.

Villages
Gmina Bolesławiec contains the villages and settlements of Bolesławiec, Bolesławiec-Chróścin, Chobot, Chotynin, Chróścin, Chróścin-Młyn, Chróścin-Zamek, Gola, Kamionka, Koziołek, Krupka, Mieleszyn, Piaski, Podbolesławiec, Podjaworek, Stanisławówka, Wiewiórka and Żdżary.

Neighbouring gminas
Gmina Bolesławiec is bordered by the gminas of Byczyna, Czastary, Łęka Opatowska, Łubnice and Wieruszów.

References
Polish official population figures 2006

Boleslawiec
Wieruszów County